Polinices aurantius is a species of predatory sea snail, a marine gastropod mollusk in the family Naticidae, the moon snails.

Distribution
This species occurs in the Indian Ocean off Madagascar.

References

 Lamarck, J. B. P. A. de. 1822. Histoire Naturelle des Animaux sans Vertèbres...Précédée d'une Introduction offrant la détermination des charactères essentiels de l'Animal, sa distinction du végétal et des autres corps naturels, enfin l'exposition des prin
 Dautzenberg, Ph. (1929). Mollusques testacés marins de Madagascar. Faune des Colonies Francaises, Tome III 
 Kabat A.R., Finet Y. & Way K. (1997) Catalogue of the Naticidae (Mollusca: Gastropoda) described by C.A. Récluz, including the location of the type specimens. Apex 12(1): 15-26.
 Hollman M. (2008) Naticidae. In Poppe G.T. (ed.) Philippine marine mollusks, vol. 1: 482-501, pls 186-195. Hackenheim: Conchbooks.
 Torigoe K. & Inaba A. (2011) Revision on the classification of Recent Naticidae. Bulletin of the Nishinomiya Shell Museum 7: 133 + 15 pp., 4 pls

External links
 Kabat A.R. (2000) Results of the Rumphius Biohistorical Expedition to Ambon (1990). Part 10. Mollusca, Gastropoda, Naticidae. Zoologische Mededelingen 73(25): 345-380

Naticidae
Gastropods described in 1798